Dizahab (meaning "region of gold" or "abundant in gold") was one of the places bounding the arabah. It is mentioned in  "These are the words Moses spoke to all Israel in the Arabah — facing Suph, between Paran and Tophel, Laban, Hazeroth and Dizahab." 

The location of Dizahab is currently unknown, but it may have been located east of the Arabah.

References

External links
Deuteronomy 1:1 Bible Commentary
King James Bible Strong's Hebrew Dictionary
Hebrew Bible places